Marion Biggs (May 2, 1823 – August 2, 1910) was an American slave owner and politician who served two terms as a United States representative from California from 1887 to 1891.

Early life
Marion Biggs was born on May 2, 1823, near Curryville, Pike County, Missouri. He was of Welsh and Scottish descent. Biggs was born one of twelve children to William Biggs and his wife. He attended schools in Missouri.

Personal life
Biggs married Ann Hawkins of Kentucky in 1842. Together, they had eleven children.

He was close friends with Thomas Hart Benton, a Missouri politician.

Career
Biggs moved to California in 1850. He engaged in the business of buying and selling mules and horses. He formed a business partnership with H. J. Glenn and S. E. Wilson. Biggs returned to Missouri with his family. In 1844, Biggs attended the 1844 Whig National Convention as a Missouri delegate. He then served as the sheriff of Monroe County from 1852 through 1856. He returned to California in 1864. In 1868, the firm of Biggs, Glenn and Wilson dissolved.

Biggs was elected to the California State Assembly from Sacramento County in 1867 and from Butte County in 1869. He was elected to the State constitutional convention from the state at large in 1878. He was elected as a Democrat to the Fiftieth and Fifty-first Congresses (March 4, 1887 – March 3, 1891). He was not a candidate for re-election in 1890. He was a commissioner to attend the centennial celebration of the inauguration of George Washington as President of the United States in 1889.

Death
Biggs resided in Gridley, California. He died in Gridley on August 2, 1910. He was originally interred in New Helvetia Cemetery, Sacramento, California. When that area was chosen to become Sutter Middle School, Biggs was re-interred in the Sacramento Historic City Cemetery.

Legacy
The city of Biggs, California was named after Biggs, who founded it.

References

External links
 
 

1823 births
1910 deaths
People from Pike County, Missouri
People from Monroe County, Missouri
Politicians from Sacramento, California
People from Gridley, California
Democratic Party members of the United States House of Representatives from California
Democratic Party members of the California State Assembly
19th-century American politicians